The Pocatello Kid is a 1931 Pre-Code American Western film, directed by Phil Rosen. It stars Ken Maynard and was released on December 6, 1931.

Cast list
 Ken Maynard as the Pocatello Kid, aka Jim Bledsoe
 Marceline Day as Mary
 Richard Cramer as Pete Larkin
 Charles King as Trinidad
 Lew Meehan as Blaze
 Tarzan, the Wonder Horse as Pocatello's horse

Plot
Maynard has a dual role as the title character and a corrupt sheriff. After the sheriff's death, a rustler talks the Pocatello Kid into becoming the new sheriff. The Kid foils the rustler's scheme by being straight rather than becoming a crooked lawman.

References

External links 
 
 
 

Films directed by Phil Rosen
1931 Western (genre) films
1931 films
American Western (genre) films
Tiffany Pictures films
American black-and-white films
1930s American films